Sudhir Chaudhary is an Indian journalist, and media personality. He is currently working at Hindi news channel, Aaj Tak as Consulting Editor and hosting it's flagship prime-time show Black & White (B & W). He was formerly the editor-in-chief and CEO of Zee News, WION, Zee Business, Zee 24 Taas and hosted the prime-time show Daily News & Analysis (DNA) on Zee News.

Career
Chaudhary has been working in the television news industry since the 1990s. He started his career in Zee news, then worked with Live India and Mi Marathi before joining Zee news again. He was in live television reporting and then 24 hours news television. Chaudhary was told to have been in the squad which has covered the Vajpayee–Musharraf Indo-Pak meeting at Islamabad, after the 2001 Indian Parliament attack.

In 2003, he left Zee News. He was instrumental in the launch of Sahara Samay, the Hindi-language news channel of the Sahara group. He also joined India TV for a brief time. In 2012, he rejoined Zee News, where he hosts the news show Daily News & Analysis (DNA).

Chaudhary resigned again from Zee News in July 2022 and joined Aaj Tak. He is hosting Aaj Tak's prime time show Black & White (B & W).

Lawsuits

Jindal extortion case 
In November 2012, Chaudhary and his colleague Sameer Ahluwalia were arrested on charges of extortion after businessman Naveen Jindal alleged that the two journalists had tried to extort  Crore worth of advertisements from his company in exchange for dropping stories that linked the Jindal Group with the Coalgate scam. The two were sent to 14-day judicial custody in Tihar Jail but were released on bail. The Broadcast Editors' Association suspended Chaudhary as its treasurer in the wake of these charges, saying that Chaudhary had acted in a manner prejudicial to the interests and objectives of the Association. In July 2018, the Jindal Group wrote to the investigating agencies saying that a settlement had been reached, and requesting them to withdraw the allegations against the journalists and close the case; on the same day, charges of bribery were filed against Jindal and others related to the case.

Allegations against Mahua Moitra
Chaudhary accused Trinamool MP Mahua Moitra of plagiarising speech of Truman Longman pointing out early signs of fascism in India while both Longman and Moitra later denied plagiarising the speech. Mahua Moitra filed criminal defamation case against Sudhir Chaudhary after which Chaudhary on his daily prime time show accepted that only a part of Mahua Moitra's speech was broadcast and showed his regrets. Zee Media also filed a defamation case against her for calling it 'chor' and 'paid' news.

Accusations of Islamophobia 
On 10 April 2020, on Zee News, Chaudhary (according to Al Jazeera) openly accused Muslims of impeding India's coronavirus war. Chaudhary said on his show DNA that the "Tablighi Jamaat betrayed the nation."

In May 2020, Kerala Police filed a first information report against Chaudhary for his March 11 broadcast of DNA, in which Chaudhary discusses the "types of jihads", which were criticized as Islamophobic.

Threats
In 2015, Sudhir Chaudhary got X-category security after allegations that someone had threatened to murder Chaudhary. In 2020, Zee News claimed that China had been monitoring Sudhir Chaudhary.

Awards
Chaudhary won a Ramnath Goenka Award for Excellence in Journalism in the "Hindi broadcast" category for 2013. He won the award for his interview with the friend of the Delhi December 16 gang-rape victim.

References

External links
 Profile in Daily News and Analysis

Living people
Indian editors
Indian male journalists
Indian television executives
Indian television news anchors
Indian television talk show hosts
20th-century Indian journalists
Indian male television journalists
Indian political journalists
India Today people
Indian extortionists
Year of birth missing (living people)